Psychoglypha is a genus of northern caddisflies in the family Limnephilidae. There are about 14 described species in Psychoglypha.

Species
These 14 species belong to the genus Psychoglypha:

 Psychoglypha alascensis (Banks, 1900)
 Psychoglypha avigo (Ross, 1941)
 Psychoglypha bella (Banks, 1903)
 Psychoglypha browni Denning, 1970
 Psychoglypha klamathi Denning, 1970
 Psychoglypha leechi Denning, 1970
 Psychoglypha mazamae Denning, 1970
 Psychoglypha ormiae (Ross, 1938)
 Psychoglypha prita (Milne, 1935)
 Psychoglypha rossi Schmid, 1952
 Psychoglypha schmidi Nimmo, 1965
 Psychoglypha schuhi Denning, 1970
 Psychoglypha smithi Denning, 1970
 Psychoglypha subborealis (Banks, 1924)

References

Further reading

 
 
 

Trichoptera genera
Articles created by Qbugbot
Integripalpia